David Boyle may refer to:

 David Boyle, 1st Earl of Glasgow (1666–1733), Scottish nobleman
 David Boyle, 7th Earl of Glasgow (1833–1915), governor-general of New Zealand
 David Boyle, 9th Earl of Glasgow (1910–1984), British nobleman and sailor
 David Boyle (archaeologist) (1842–1911), Canadian educator and archaeologist
 David Boyle (author) (born 1958), British economics author and journalist
 David Boyle (cricketer) (born 1961), New Zealand cricketer
 David Boyle (diplomat), (1883–1970), British intelligence officer
 David Boyle (footballer) (1929–2009), English professional footballer
 David Boyle, Lord Boyle (1772–1853), Scottish judge and privy counsellor of the United Kingdom
 David Boyle (rugby league, born 1959), Australian rugby league footballer for South Sydney
 David Boyle (rugby league, born 1971), Australian rugby league footballer for Canberra